Dmitry Vorobyov may refer to
Dmitriy Vorobyov (born 1977), Russian and Ukrainian football goalkeeper
Dmitry Vorobyov (born 1985), Russian ice hockey player
Dmitry Vorobyov (footballer) (born 1997), Russian football forward
Dzmitry Varabyow (born 2001), Belarusian footballer
Dmitry Lensky (pseudonym of Dmitry Timofeyevich Vorobyov) (1805–1860), Russian writer